Jason Higgins (born 28 March 1995) is an Irish-born Canadian rugby union player, currently playing for the San Diego Legion of Major League Rugby (MLR) and the Canadian national team. His preferred position is scrum-half.

Professional career
Higgins signed for Major League Rugby side Toronto Arrows for the 2021 Major League Rugby season. Higgins made his debut for Canada in the 2023 Rugby World Cup Qualifiers.

In January 2022, it was announced that Higgins had signed for the San Diego Legion.

References

External links
itsrugby.co.uk Profile

1995 births
Living people
Canadian rugby union players
Canada international rugby union players
Rugby union scrum-halves
Rugby union players from Cork (city)
Rugby New York players
Toronto Arrows players
San Diego Legion players